John Whitin Lasell Jr. (born November 6, 1928) is an American film and television actor. He is known for playing Dr. Peter Guthrie in the American soap opera television series Dark Shadows.

Lasell was born in Williamstown, Vermont. He began his television career in 1960 in the anthology television series Armstrong Circle Theatre. In the same year he appeared in Hong Kong and Alcoa Presents: One Step Beyond. Lasell played John Wilkes Booth in the anthology television series The Twilight Zone in the episode "Back There". He played the recurring roles of Dr. Robbins in Lassie and Benjamin Wedlock in the drama television series Dan August, and made three appearances in the legal drama television series Perry Mason.

He guest-starred in numerous television programs including Gunsmoke, Wagon Train, Rawhide, Tales of Wells Fargo, 12 O'Clock High, The Fugitive, Adam-12, Mannix, Ben Casey, The Streets of San Francisco and Shotgun Slade. He appeared in five films. His final television credit was from the soap opera television series Falcon Crest.

Filmography

References

External links 

Rotten Tomatoes profile

1928 births
Living people
People from Williamstown, Vermont
Male actors from Vermont
American male film actors
American male television actors
American male Shakespearean actors
American male stage actors
American male soap opera actors
20th-century American male actors